William Cavendish may refer to:

Earls
William Cavendish, 1st Earl of Devonshire (1552–1626) 
William Cavendish, 2nd Earl of Devonshire (1591–1628)
William Cavendish, 3rd Earl of Devonshire (1617–1684)

Dukes
William Cavendish, 1st Duke of Newcastle (1592–1676)
William Cavendish, 1st Duke of Devonshire (1640–1707)
William Cavendish, 2nd Duke of Devonshire (1673–1729)
William Cavendish, 3rd Duke of Devonshire (1698–1755)
William Cavendish, 4th Duke of Devonshire (1720–1764), British prime minister
William Cavendish, 5th Duke of Devonshire (1748–1811)
William Cavendish, 6th Duke of Devonshire (1790–1858)
William Cavendish, 7th Duke of Devonshire (1808–1891)
William Cavendish-Bentinck, 3rd Duke of Portland (1738–1809)
William Cavendish-Scott-Bentinck, 5th Duke of Portland (1800–1879)

Others
William Cavendish (courtier) (1505–1557), English courtier
William Cavendish (English politician, born 1783) (died 1812), son of Lord George Augustus Henry Cavendish, later 1st Earl of Burlington
William Cavendish, 2nd Baron Chesham (1815–1882)
William Cavendish, Marquess of Hartington (1917–1944), son of Edward Cavendish, the 10th Duke and elder brother of the 11th
William Cavendish, Earl of Burlington (born 1969), son of Peregrine Cavendish, 12th Duke of Devonshire
William Hunter Cavendish (c. 1740–1818), colonial pioneer